Mt. Sisa is a heavily eroded Pleistocene  stratovolcano in Hela, Papua New Guinea. The northern peak has a communications mast. The epicentre of the 2018 Papua New Guinea earthquake was on the mountain's northern foothills.

A tiny species of frogs, Choerophryne allisoni, is only known from its type locality on Mount Sisa.

See also
Mount Sisa languages

References 

Stratovolcanoes of Papua New Guinea
Pleistocene stratovolcanoes